Rudolf Müller may refer to:
 
Rudolf Müller (bishop), German Roman Catholic bishop
Rudolf Müller (pilot), German pilot